The 1965 Carmel mid-air collision occurred on December 4, 1965, when Eastern Air Lines Flight 853 (N6218C), a Lockheed Super Constellation en route from Boston Logan International Airport to Newark International Airport, collided in mid-air with Trans World Airlines Flight 42 (N748TW), a Boeing 707-131B en route from San Francisco International Airport to John F. Kennedy International Airport, over Carmel, New York, United States.

TWA Flight 42 made an emergency landing at John F. Kennedy International Airport, while Eastern Air Lines Flight 853 was forced to make a crash landing on Hunt Mountain in North Salem, New York. Three passengers died, plus the Constellation's pilot, Captain Charles J. White, who had returned to the aircraft's cabin to help the last passenger.

Accident
The TWA Boeing 707 and the Eastern Air Lines Constellation approached the Carmel VORTAC at the same time. As the Constellation emerged from a cloud puff, First Officer Roger I. Holt Jr. saw the Boeing in his right side window at the 2 o'clock position. The aircraft appeared to be converging rapidly at the same altitude. Holt shouted, "Look out," placed his hands on the control wheel, and made a rapid application of up elevator simultaneously with Captain White, causing crew members and passengers to be forced down into their seats.

TWA Flight 42
Aboard the Boeing, the crew was preparing for arrival at JFK International, flying in clear air above an overcast sky with good visibility as they approached Carmel. The aircraft was being flown on autopilot with altitude-hold engaged, and the pilot, Capt. Thomas H. Carroll, had his left hand on the control yoke. On seeing an aircraft at his 10 o'clock position on what appeared to be a collision course, he immediately disengaged the autopilot, put the wheel hard over to the right, and pulled back on the yoke. His copilot, First Officer Leo M. Smith, also grabbed the controls and acted together with him. The aircraft rolled to the right and it became apparent that this maneuver would not allow the two aircraft to pass clear of each other, so Carroll and Smith attempted to reverse the wheel to the left and pushed on the yoke. Before the aircraft could react to the control reversal, two shocks were felt and the Boeing entered a steep dive; the Boeing's left wing had struck the tail of the Constellation and both aircraft were out of control.

The Boeing crew recovered from the dive, declared an emergency with New York Center, and received the first of many vectors to JFK International. They performed a damage assessment and asked that crash and fire equipment stand by. The Boeing was vectored south of JFK International where it made a wide 360 degree turn to check that the landing gear was fully down and to determine how the airplane would fly at approach speeds, and made a safe landing on Runway 31L at 1640.

Eastern Air Lines Flight 853
Following the collision, the Eastern Air Lines Constellation continued to climb. The crew felt the aircraft shudder and begin a left-turning dive back into the clouds. There was no response from the controls or trim tabs, but the crew discovered that a degree of control was available by adjusting the throttles. The aircraft descended through solid clouds and a recovery was made below the clouds using throttles only. Several zooms were then made back into the clouds as the pilots attempted to gain control of their aircraft.

The pilots discovered a throttle setting that would maintain a descent in level attitude, with airspeed maintained between 125 and 140 knots; the nose rose when power was increased and fell when power was decreased.  Their rate of descent could be maintained at approximately 500 feet per minute.

It was obvious to the pilots that the Constellation was badly damaged and that they needed to make an emergency landing.  However, they were over mainly wooded terrain on the Connecticut-New York border, and the few fields were surrounded by stone walls, sited on sloping terrain, and not large enough.  Captain White advised the passengers that there had been a collision, that the aircraft was out of control, and that a crash landing would be made.

The aircraft descended on a southwest heading over Danbury Municipal Airport, Connecticut at an altitude of 2,000 feet.  Around two miles ahead, White spotted a pasture halfway up Hunt Mountain, a 900 ft ridge running perpendicular to the Constellation's flightpath. He aligned the aircraft using asymmetric thrust, told passengers to brace themselves, and descended into the upward-sloping hillside with wheels and flaps retracted. At the last moment he jammed the throttles forward to pitch up the aircraft's nose, letting the Constellation pancake into the 15-percent slope.

The crash-landing site was 4.2 miles north of an area where numerous parts from both aircraft were later found by investigators. The first impact was on a tree that was found broken 46 feet above the ground. 250 feet farther on, the left wing contacted another tree, and was separated from the aircraft. The fuselage contacted the ground at the same point, and the aircraft came to rest on the slope. The fuselage had been broken into three pieces, and all the engines had been separated from their nacelles.

The cockpit and cabin crews survived the crash landing and worked both inside and outside the broken fuselage parts to evacuate the survivors from the wreckage, which was on fire. Volunteer firemen from North Salem, Ridgefield, Connecticut, and nearby communities extinguished the fire and transported the survivors to hospitals at Danbury, Connecticut; Mount Kisco, New York; and Carmel, New York, where two passengers later died of their injuries. Firefighters later discovered two bodies in the fuselage - that of a male passenger in the forward section, whose seatbelt jammed, and that of Captain White, who had returned to the cabin to help the passenger. Both had died from smoke inhalation.

Notable passengers
 Noted electrical engineer and physicist Warren P. Mason and his second wife were among the suvivors of  the Constellation crash.

Investigation

Conclusions
Misjudgment of altitude separation by the crew of EA 853 because of an optical illusion created by the up-slope effect of cloud tops resulted in an evasive maneuver and a reactive evasive maneuver by the TWA 42 crew.

References

External links

 2014 USA Today story on the crash landing of Flight 853

1965 in New York (state)
Accidents and incidents involving the Boeing 707
Accidents and incidents involving the Lockheed Constellation
Aviation accidents and incidents in the United States in 1965
Mid-air collisions
Mid-air collisions involving airliners
Airliner accidents and incidents in New York (state)
Putnam County, New York
Eastern Air Lines accidents and incidents
Trans World Airlines accidents and incidents
December 1965 events in the United States
Airliner accidents and incidents involving belly landings